The 1941–42 Drexel Dragons men's basketball team represented Drexel Institute of Technology during the 1941–42 men's basketball season. The Dragons, led by 3rd year head coach Lawrence Mains, played their home games at Curtis Hall Gym.

Roster

Schedule

|-
!colspan=9 style="background:#F8B800; color:#002663;"| Regular season
|-

References

Drexel Dragons men's basketball seasons
Drexel
1941 in sports in Pennsylvania
1942 in sports in Pennsylvania